Drum Corps United Kingdom (DCUK) is a governing organization for drum and bugle corps in the United Kingdom. DCUK operates the British drum corps circuit which holds drum and bugle corps competitions for corps across the country. It is part of the national charity Marching & Performing Arts UK.

DCUK is a strategic partner of Drum Corps International and through this partnership offers DrumLine Battle and SoundSport in the UK.

About 
Competitive Corps participate in competitions between the months of June to September, traditionally the British Drum Corps Championships takes place on the weekend before last in September. Competitions occur at sports arenas (i.e. athletic tracks, football or rugby grounds) and are judged by a panel of approved and training volunteer Judges on general effect, visual performance, and musical performance. Every year, each drum corps prepares a single new show, approximately 8–15 minutes in length, and carefully refines this throughout the entire summer year. This focus on a singular show takes advantage of the large amount of time needed to honing and refining a modern drum corps program, with a momentum that continues to build up to the last performance of the season, the Drum Corps United Kingdom Championships. DCUK finals has been held at the Select Security Stadium since 2013.

Adjudication 
DCUK utilizes the adjudication manual published by Drum Corps Europe which is based on three broad categories: Music, Visual and Effect. Each of the categories are further subdivided into reference criteria, or captions. All sanctioned competitions require nine adjudicators, including an adjudicator responsible for Timing & Penalties.

Past champions 
Below is a list of champions organized by class.

See also
 Drum Corps International
 Drum Corps Europe

References

External links
 
 Drum Corps United Kingdom at DrumCorpsWiki

Drum and bugle corps
1980 establishments in the United Kingdom
Organizations established in 1980
Music organisations based in the United Kingdom